Our Futures  is a 2015 French comedy-drama film directed by Rémi Bezançon. The film stars Pio Marmaï, Pierre Rochefort and Mélanie Bernier.

Plot
Yann Kerbec is in his thirties and has been leading a mundane and stale life. One day, he decides to meet up with Thomas, a childhood friend whom he has not seen since his high school days and together they set out to revisit and relive the past.

Cast 
 Pio Marmaï as Thomas 
 Pierre Rochefort as Yann Kerbec 
 Mélanie Bernier as Estelle
 Kyan Khojandi as Max
 Camille Cottin as Géraldine
 Laurence Arné as Emma
 Roxane Mesquida as Virginie
 Micha Lescot as Samy
 Aurélien Wiik as Vincent
 Thibault Duboucher as Nico
 Jean-Pierre Lorit as Michel
 Samuel Theis as Yann's father

References

External links 
 

2015 films
2010s buddy comedy-drama films
2010s French-language films
French buddy comedy-drama films
Films directed by Rémi Bezançon
Gaumont Film Company films
2015 comedy films
2015 drama films
2010s French films